The Konsh Valley is located on the extreme northern borders of the Mansehra district of Khyber-Pakhtunkhwa province of Pakistan. The town of Battal is considered to be the headquarters of the valley.  The Silk Route, also known as the Karakoram highway, passes through it leading to Gilgit.  Towns, like Battal, and structures in the area, were severely damaged by the 2005 Kashmir earthquake. Konsh Valley, located in northwest Mansehra, like many other areas in the district, suffered severe damage. However, it has not received adequate attention compared to the other affected valleys in Mansehra.
Konsh Valley has a total area of 23500 hectares. The altitude varies from 1067 meters at Ichhrian to 2911 meters at Bahishti Sar. The valley is inhabited by more than 76,000 people, made up of three main trips: Sayyed, Sawati and Gujars, reside in the area. Union Councils (UCs) are the main units of administration and have elected memberships. Maintenance of law and order and revenue collection are the major functions of the district government. Line agencies are represented at the district level and below. 
Livelihoods in Konsh are based primarily on livestock, rangelands and forest, and off-farm incomes. An average household keeps one or two buffalos, cows/oxen, some goats and sheep. Livestock provide milk products and animal draft power, and also serve as a form of savings. The fodder shortage is highest between January and April. The average farm is small and income from crop production is secondary to most households. Maize is the predominant crop. Wheat and potatoes are also grown, and some vegetables, where water is not a constraint. Most of the fields are terraced, but cropping on un-terraced slopes is also common, and causes accelerated soil erosion. There is potential for increased production of off season vegetables, fruits and fodder crops. 
The earthquake has had multiple effects on livelihoods, and subsequent aftershocks, torrential rains, flooding and mudslides compounded the impact. The initial focus on relief and rebuilding rendered all economic activity to a minimum. Men were reluctant to leave their wives and daughters alone in camps while they found work, and migrant casual labourers returned home to assist families. Those who rely on remittances are buffering the impact. In addition, village shopkeepers have not only stopped providing credit, they have also been unable to provide food and non-food items. Poor and very poor households, typically reliant on local shopkeepers, have suffered immensely.

External links  

Valleys of Khyber Pakhtunkhwa